The 1974–75 All-Ireland Senior Club Hurling Championship was the 5th national club hurling competition since its establishment in 1970–71. The first matches of the season were played in the winter of 1974 and the championship ended on 16 March 1975. Blackrock went into the 1974–75 championship as defending champions, having won their second All-Ireland title the previous year.

The championship culminated with the All-Ireland club final, held at Croke Park, Dublin. The match was contested by St. Finbarr's of Cork and Fenians of Kilkenny.  St. Finbarr's won the game by 3–8 to 1–6.  It was their first ever All-Ireland title.

Format
The 1974–75 club championship was played on a straight knock-out basis.  Each of the participating counties entered their respective club champions.  The format of the competition was as follows:

Provincial Championships

The Leinster, Connacht, Munster and Ulster championships were played on a straight knock-out basis. The four respective champions from these provinces advanced directly to the All-Ireland semi-finals.

All-Ireland Series

Semi-finals: (2 matches) The Munster champions played the Connacht champions while the Leinster champions played the Ulster champions.  The winners of these two games contested the All-Ireland club final.

Results

Connacht Senior Club Hurling Championship

Quarter-finals

Semi-final

Final

Leinster Senior Club Hurling Championship

First round

Quarter-finals

Semi-finals

Final

Munster Senior Club Hurling Championship

Quarter-finals

Semi-finals

Final

Ulster Senior Club Hurling Championship

Semi-final

Final

All-Ireland Senior Club Hurling Championship

Semi-finals

Final

Championship statistics

Top scorers

Top scorers overall

1974 in hurling
1975 in hurling
All-Ireland Senior Club Hurling Championship